Gustavo Daniel Eberto (30 August 1983 – 3 September 2007) was an Argentine soccer goalkeeper, for the Club Atlético Boca Juniors. He played for the Argentina Under-20 team in the 2003 FIFA World Youth Championship.

Eberto died of testicular cancer in 2007 at the age of 24.

Titles

External links

Young Argentine soccer goalkeeper dies, Xinhua News Agency, September 3, 2007

1983 births
2007 deaths
People from Paso de los Libres
Argentine footballers
Argentina under-20 international footballers
Boca Juniors footballers
Talleres de Córdoba footballers
Argentine Primera División players
Association football goalkeepers
Deaths from testicular cancer
Deaths from cancer in Argentina
Pan American Games medalists in football
Pan American Games gold medalists for Argentina
Footballers at the 2003 Pan American Games
Medalists at the 2003 Pan American Games
Sportspeople from Corrientes Province